The International Hot-Air Balloon Festival in Château-d'Oex is a hot-air balloons festival that has taken place every year during nine days at the end of January in Château-d'Œx, Switzerland since 1979. It is attended by nearly a hundred balloons from over twenty countries. It is famous for taking place in a snowy valley (most of the time) and also for a unique event : the "night-glow" show, where all the balloons are exposed on the mountain, lit by their burners, during the evening of the 7th day.

References

External links
 www.ballonchateaudoex.ch

Hot air balloon festivals
Tourist attractions in the canton of Vaud
Festivals in Switzerland
Château-d'Œx
Sports festivals in Switzerland
Winter events in Switzerland